Silliman Pass is a mountain pass on the border of Sequoia National Park and Kings Canyon National Park. 

Location
It stands on the Kings-Kaweah Divide, loosely north of Mount Silliman.,  It is directly south of Twin Peaks.

For whom it was named

Like Mount Silliman, it was named for Benjamin Silliman, professor of chemistry at Yale College.

References

External links
Photos:
One photo
Another photo
Hiking to and over the pass
Climbing Mount Silliman via Silliman Pass
One map
Another map, showing the Kings-Kaweah Divide

Sequoia National Park
Mountain passes of California